Maria Celestina Fernandes (born 12 September 1945) is an Angolan children's author. She has also written poetry and short stories, and had earlier careers as a social worker and lawyer. She has won several awards including Prémio Literário Jardim do Livro Infantil, Prémio Caxinde do Conto Infantil, and Prémio Excelência Literária (Troféu Corujão das Letras).

Early life
Maria Celestina Fernandes was born in Lubango on 12 September 1945, the daughter of a civil servant father. She was educated at the Salvador Correia High School in Luanda.

Fernandes trained as a social worker at the Pio XII Institute of Social Work, and earned a bachelor's degree in law from the Faculty of Law of Agostinho Neto University.

Career
In 1975, Fernandes started work at the National Bank of Angola, and remained there for more than two decades, rising from the head of the social department to deputy director of the legal department, and later retired.

Fernandes started writing in the late 1980s, initially in the Jornal de Angola and the Boletim da Organização da Mulher Angolana (OMA). Since 1990, she has published numerous books. In February 2016, she took part in a literature festival in Lisbon, Portugal, hosted by the country's former President, Jorge Sampaio.

Fernandes is a member of the Angolan Writers' Union and the Chá de Caxinde Association.

Selected publications
Her publications include:
 A borboleta cor de ouro, UEA, 1990
 Kalimba, INALD, 1992
 A árvore dos gingongos, Edições Margem. 1993
 A rainha tartaruga, INALD, 1997
 A filha do soba, Nzila, 2001
 O presente, Chá de Caxinde, 2002
 A estrela que sorri, UEA, 2005
 É preciso prevenir, UEA, 2006
 As três aventureiras no parque e a joaninha, UEA, 2006
 União Arco-Íris, INALD, 2006
 Colectânea de contos, INALD, 2006
 Retalhos da vida, INALD, 1992
 Poemas, UEA, 1995
 O meu canto, UEA, 2004
 Os panos brancos, UEA, 2004
 A Muxiluanda, Chá de Caxinde, 2008

Awards
Her awards include:
 Prémio Literário Jardim do Livro Infantil, 2010
 Prémio Caxinde do Conto Infantil, 2012
 Prémio Excelência Literária (Troféu Corujão das Letras), 2015

References

1945 births
Living people
Angolan poets
Angolan women poets
Angolan lawyers
People from Lubango
Women lawyers